Weihe is a river of Hesse and Thuringia, Germany. It flows into the Werra in Gerstungen.

See also
List of rivers of Hesse
List of rivers of Thuringia

References

Rivers of Hesse
Rivers of Thuringia
Rivers of Germany